Johnpaul George is an Indian script writer and film director active in the Malayalam film industry. He is best known for his debut film Guppy, which was released in August 2016.

Personal life
Johnpaul George was born in Thuruthy, Changanassery, to K.V George and Reethamma George. He graduated with a Bachelor of Performing Arts (B.P.A.), vocal in music, from Swathi Thirunal College of Music, Thiruvananthapuram. However, while doing that course, he felt that he should pursue cinema. He was also strongly influenced by his mother in entering the film field.

Film career
He started his film career as a chief assistant director in the 2011 Rajesh Pillai–directed movie Traffic. Later, he was the associate director for Sameer Thahir in the following movies: Chaappa Kurishu, 5 Sundarikal, and Neelakasham Pachakadal Chuvanna Bhoomi. He also worked as the production partner of 'E4 Entertainment' from 2013 to 2016. He made his directorial movie debut through the Malayalam movie Guppy, which was released in August 2016. He is also the producer of Romancham, which was released in February 2023.

Awards
 Best Debutant Director – South Indian International Movie Award

Filmography

As director

As associate director

As Chief Assistant Director

As producer

References

External links
 

Malayalam film directors
Malayali people
Living people
Film directors from Kerala
Artists from Kottayam
21st-century Indian film directors
Year of birth missing (living people)